Nikola Gápová (born 19 June 1989) is a Slovak retired ice hockey forward.

International career

Gápová was selected for the Slovakia national women's ice hockey team in the 2010 Winter Olympics. She played in all five games, but did not score a point. She played all three games of the qualifying campaigns for the 2010 and 2014 Olympics.

Gápová has also appeared for Slovakia at five IIHF Women's World Championships, across three levels. Her first appearance came in 2007. She appeared at the top level championships in 2011 and 2012.

Career statistics

International career

References

External links

1989 births
Sportspeople from Poprad
Living people
Olympic ice hockey players of Slovakia
Ice hockey players at the 2010 Winter Olympics
Slovak women's ice hockey forwards
Universiade medalists in ice hockey
Universiade bronze medalists for Slovakia
Competitors at the 2011 Winter Universiade
Slovak expatriate ice hockey players in Finland
Slovak expatriate ice hockey players in the Czech Republic